Oglethorpe University is a private college in Brookhaven, Georgia. It was chartered in 1835 and named in honor of General James Edward Oglethorpe, founder of the Colony of Georgia.

History

Oglethorpe University was chartered in 1834 in Midway, just south  of Milledgeville, then the state capital. The school was built and, at that time, governed by the Presbyterian Church, making it one of the South's earliest denominational institutions. The American Civil War led to the school's closing in 1862.

The college followed the relocation of the capital to Atlanta. In 1870, it began holding classes at the present site of Atlanta City Hall. Plagued by financial difficulties, the school closed its doors for a second time in 1872.

Oglethorpe College was re-chartered as a non-denominational institution in 1913 by Thornwell Jacobs. In 1915 the cornerstone to the new campus was laid at its present location on Peachtree Road in Brookhaven. The cornerstone-laying ceremony took place at North Avenue Presbyterian Church. The person behind rebuilding Oglethorpe was Thornwell Jacobs, whose grandfather Ferdinand Jacobs had served on the faculty of Old Oglethorpe. Jacobs would serve as president for nearly 30 years.

In the early 1940s Oglethorpe University had a medical school. Under the direction of John Bernard, the university was given several elephants for research that were discovered to have been poisoned at a Ringling Brothers Barnum & Bailey Circus event nearby. After the students finished dissecting the animals they were buried under what is known today as the Philip Weltner Library. 

In 1936, William Randolph Hearst gifted  to the university, and in 1948 he made a donation of $100,000; The university administration building was subsequently named in honor of Hearst's mother, Phoebe Hearst. 

Oglethorpe University became Oglethorpe College in 1965, and reclaimed the designation "university" in 1972. Oglethorpe's campus buildings were built in a Gothic revival architecture style. This area of the  campus is listed in the National Register of Historic Places.

Academics
The college is accredited by the Southern Association of Colleges and Schools.

Coat of arms
Oglethorpe's collegiate coat-of-arms is emblazoned with three boars' heads and the Latin inscription Nescit Cedere, meaning "He does not know how to give up."

Campus
The Conant Performing Arts Center, completed in 1997, served as the seasonal home of Georgia Shakespeare until fall 2014.

The Oglethorpe University Museum of Art opened in 1984 and is located on the top floor of the Philip Weltner Library. The two galleries, the South and Skylight, and gift shop cover 7,000 square feet. Bringing in thousands of visitors each year, the museum has become an important point of interest in Atlanta's art community.

In 1994, Lupton Hall, Phoebe Hearst Hall, Lowry Hall and Hermance Stadium were added to the National Register of Historic Places. In addition, a historic district including part or all of the  campus was listed on the National Register of Historic Places.

Other academic buildings include Goslin Hall, primarily used for science courses, and J. Mack Robinson Hall, primarily used for Communication and Art classes.

Oglethorpe University is home to the Crypt of Civilization, the first and most complete time capsule ever created, according to the Guinness Book of World Records. Scheduled to be opened in AD 8113, it is located in the basement of Phoebe Hearst Hall. Oglethorpe University is also home to the International Time Capsule Society, a repository of time capsule projects worldwide.

The Turner Lynch Campus Center opened in the fall of 2013. The IW "Ike" Cousins Center for Science and Innovation (an expansion of a building constructed in 1970) opened in 2019. In addition to science facilities, it houses the Q. William Hammack Jr. School of Business.

From its opening in 1990 until 2003, the Seigakuin Atlanta International School was located on the property of Oglethorpe University, in a former public school building.

Study abroad
Oglethorpe University promotes the concept of international education and travel as an essential component of an academic education. Oglethorpe University Students Abroad sponsors trips for-credit, short-term, partnerships and agreements. Oglethorpe University offers a selection of opportunities in four divisions: International Exchange Partnerships, Independent Study Abroad-Non Partnerships, Short Term Trips, and Associate Student Programs for Special Study Abroad.

For foreign students wishing to study in the United States, Education First, an International Study Abroad Organization, opened its Atlanta Language Center on the Oglethorpe University Campus in the fall 2012.

Greek life
As of 2014, U.S. News & World Report noted that 11% of men at Oglethorpe belong to fraternities, while 13% of women belong to sororities.

Fraternities
Alpha Phi Alpha
Chi Phi
Delta Sigma Phi
Sigma Alpha Epsilon

Sororities
Alpha Kappa Alpha
Alpha Sigma Tau
Chi Omega
Epsilon Iota Psi (local sorority)
Sigma Sigma Sigma

Events and traditions

Oglethorpe Day
In early February, the college hosts events to celebrate the anniversary of James Oglethorpe's founding of the colony of Georgia. The annual "Petrels of Fire" race, an homage to Trinity College's Great Court Run portrayed in the movie Chariots of Fire, features students attempting to run the  perimeter of the Academic Quad before the Lupton Hall belltower finishes its noon chimes.

Boar's Head

Held on the first Friday of December, this event is modeled after the Boar's Head Gaudy of Queen's College, Oxford, Boar's Head is the traditional start to the Christmas season at Oglethorpe. Festivities include a concert featuring the University Singers, student organizations and performers from the community, as well as the lighting of the college's Christmas tree. Newly initiated members of Omicron Delta Kappa receive recognition and, as a rite of initiation, kiss the ceremonial boar's head.

Battle of Bloody Marsh
The "battle" is a tug-of-war between a student team and a faculty–staff team, organized by the student government's programming board, that takes place in the fall on the Academic Quad. The name refers to the 1742 battle in which the forces of General Oglethorpe defeated the Spanish troops in South Georgia.

Eggs AM Breakfast
During the fall and spring semesters on "Dead Day," the day before finals begin, faculty and staff cook a breakfast of eggs, pancakes, bacon, and hash-browns for the students. The students enjoy their faculty and staff-cooked meal and take a little break between study sessions.

Carillon Ceremony
In the week before graduation, seniors are invited to climb the Lupton Hall belltower to ring a carillon bell in celebration of their academic achievements. This event is sponsored by the alumni office and followed by a champagne toast on the academic quad.

Athletics

Oglethorpe University teams compete as a member of the Southern Athletic Association (SAA) at the NCAA Division III level. The Stormy Petrels were a member of the Southern Collegiate Athletic Conference (SCAC) until 2012. Men's sports include baseball, basketball, cross country, golf, lacrosse, soccer, tennis and track & field; while women's sports include basketball, cross country, golf, lacrosse, soccer, tennis, track & field, and volleyball.

The most successful athletic program is its men's golf team. Oglethorpe won the NCAA Division III Men's Golf Championships in 2009 and again in 2012. They qualified for 18 straight NCAA tournaments from 2000-2017, and earned their 14th top 10 finish at the event in 2019.

Former Major League Soccer player Jon Akin is the head men's soccer coach at Oglethorpe University. In 2014, men's assistant coach Ryan Roushandel signed with the Atlanta Silverbacks to play soccer professionally while maintaining his duties with the program at Oglethorpe.

In 2011, the men's soccer program won its first conference championship in school history with a 1–0 victory over Centre College. This win sent them to the NCAA Division III Men's Soccer Championship, also a first in school history for the program. Later on in the spring of 2013, Mark Lavery, an alumnus and All-American member of the 2011 team signed with the Atlanta Silverbacks, a professional soccer team in the North American Soccer League (NASL).  Lavery became the first Oglethorpe graduate to play soccer professionally.

In the fall of 2013, the men's soccer team won its second conference championship in school history with a 3–1 victory over Millsaps College. They compiled an 11–3–3 record over the season. The team did not receive a bid into the NCAA national tournament because the Southern Athletic Association was in its second phase of a new-conference transition stage.The men's soccer team won the SAA championship for the second time in 2017 and advanced to the second round of the NCAA tournament, losing to host Washington and Lee University in a penalty shootout after beating North Carolina Wesleyan College in the first round. They finished first in SAA regular season play each season from 2015 to 2018.

The women's basketball program earned four straight bids to the NCAA Division III Women's Basketball Championship from 2006-2009, culminating in trips to the national semifinals in 2008 and the round of 16 in 2009. They also won the program's only SCAC championship in 2009.

More recently, the program saw a resurgence with back-to-back trips to the national tournament in 2018 and 2019, and an SAA championship in 2018. The team advanced to the second round of the NCAA tournament in 2019, beating The University of Chicago in the opening round before falling to host Transylvania University in the second round.

Mascot
Thornwell Jacobs chose an unusual mascot to represent Oglethorpe's athletic teams: the Stormy Petrel, a seabird said to have been admired by James Oglethorpe for its hardiness and courage. In March 2002, ESPN's David Lloyd named the Stormy Petrel as one of the most memorable college mascot names of all time, second only to the Banana Slugs of UC Santa Cruz.

Student media
 The Carillon, alumni magazine
 The Stormy Petrel, student newspaper.
 The Yamacraw, yearbook. Its name comes from Yamacraw Bluff, the landing site of James Oglethorpe's 1733 colonial expedition. Now defunct.
 The Tower, literary magazine
 The Nightcap, evening degree student newsletter

Notable alumni
 Luke Appling, class of 1932; member of the Major League Baseball Hall of Fame.
 Margaret Elizabeth Ashley-Towle, class of 1923; American archaeologist.
 John G. Blowers, Jr., jazz musician and former drummer for Frank Sinatra, Louis Armstrong, and the Harlem Blues & Jazz Band.
 Joseph Mackey Brown, class of 1872; governor of Georgia
 John Burke, class of 2011; Grammy-nominated pianist and composer.
 William C. Kavanaugh, class of 1940; former member of the Wisconsin State Assembly.
 Dar'shun Kendrick, class of 2004; Georgia politician and lawyer.
 Sidney Lanier, class of 1860; poet of post-Civil War era.
 Benjamin M. Palmer, class of 1852; first national moderator of Presbyterian Church, based in New Orleans.
 Vincent Sherman, class of 1925; Hollywood film director with more than 30 movies to his credit, including Mr. Skeffington (1944) and The Young Philadelphians (1959).
 Charles Weltner, class of 1948; former U.S. representative, Georgia Supreme Court Justice and recipient of the Profiles in Courage Award.
Emily S. Gurley, class of 1996; American epidemiologist.
Ruwa Romman, Representative for Georgia House District 97, first Muslim woman in the Georgia House of Representatives

See also
 Crypt of Civilization

References

Further reading

External links

 
 Oglethorpe Athletics website
 Photographs of Buildings and Grounds at Oglethorpe University
 Oglethorpe University historical marker

 
Historic districts on the National Register of Historic Places in Georgia (U.S. state)
Educational institutions established in 1835
Universities and colleges accredited by the Southern Association of Colleges and Schools
Universities and colleges in Atlanta
National Register of Historic Places in Atlanta
Private universities and colleges in Georgia (U.S. state)